The 2015–16 Slovenian Second League season was the 25th edition of the Slovenian Second League. The season began on 9 August 2015 and ended on 22 May 2016.

Competition format
Each team played a total of 27 matches. Teams played 3 matches against each other.

Teams

Krško was promoted to the Slovenian PrvaLiga after the 2014–15 season
Radomlje was relegated from the Slovenian PrvaLiga after the 2014–15 season
Drava and Zarica were promoted from the Slovenian Third League after the 2014–15 season
Dravinja and Šmartno were relegated to the Slovenian Third League after the 2014–15 season.

Stadiums and locations

League table

Standings

Positions by round

Round 16 was the final round before the winter break

Results

First and second round

Third round

Season statistics

Top goalscorers

Source: 2. SNL official website

Attendances

 
 Note 1:Team played in the Slovenian PrvaLiga the previous season.   Note 2:Team played in the Slovenian Third League the previous season.   Note 3:Team has played 13 home matches.   Note 4:Team has played 14 home matches.

See also
2015 Slovenian Supercup
2015–16 Slovenian Cup
2015–16 Slovenian PrvaLiga
2015–16 Slovenian Third League

References

External links
 
2. SNL at Soccerway.com

Slovenian Second League seasons
2015–16 in Slovenian football
Sloveniae, 2015-16